The AFF U-17 Youth Championship was played for the second time in 2005.

The championship was held in Nam Định, Vietnam from 12 August 2006 to 16 August 2006

Only 4 nations took part, 3 from the ASEAN region and guest nation Bangladesh from the SAFF region

The tournament was played in a round-robin group with the winners of the group crowned champions.

Participating nations

Fixtures & results

See also 
Football at the Southeast Asian Games
AFC
AFC Asian Cup
East Asian Cup
Arabian Gulf Cup
South Asian Football Federation Cup
West Asian Football Federation Championship

External links 
ASEAN Football Federation

2006 in AFF football
2006
AFF U-17 Youth
2006
2006 in youth association football